Kwame Adom Frimpong (born 19 December 1996) is a Ghanaian professional footballer who plays as midfielder for Ghana Premier League side Asante Kotoko S.C. He previously had stints in Sweden playing for Dalkurd FF, KSF Prespa Birlik and Mjällby AIF and in Oman for Salalah SC.

Club career

Early career 
Frimpong played for Swedish Division 1 side Dalkurd FF in 2015.

KSF Prespa Birlik 
In 2016, Frimpong moved to Swedish lower-tier side KSF Prespa Birlik who had just been promoted into the Swedish Division 1 League. He made his league debut on 30 April 2016 in a 1–2 loss against IK Oddevold. He played in 21 league matches in the 2016 season.

Mjällby AIF 
In December 2016, he moved to fellow Swedish team Mjällby AIF on a free transfer. The team then played in the Swedish Division 1 League. He went on to play in 12 league matches in the 2017 season. In 2018, Ghanaian compatriot Prosper Kasim joined Mjällby whilst he was playing for them.

Salalah SC 
After the expiration of his contract with Mjällby, he signed for Oman First Division League side Salalah SC in 2018, where he spent one season playing and left the club when the season concluded.

Asante Kotoko 
In December 2019, Frimpong signed a 3-year deal with Ghana Premier League giants Kumasi Asante Kotoko ahead of the 2019–20 Ghana Premier League. He was expected to fill the void left by club veteran Jordan Opoku who had part ways with the club. On 12 January 2020, he came on in 43rd minute for Salifu Mudasiru in a 1–0 loss against Berekum Chelsea to make his league debut. Before the 2019–20 Ghana Premier League season was cancelled due to the COVID-19 pandemic, he had played 11 league matches out of 14 to help Kotoko to 3rd on the league table trailing just 3 points to 1st place Aduana Stars. He was named in the club's squad list for the 2020–21 Ghana Premier League season. He played all 3 matches during their 2020–21 CAF Champions League campaign and 1 match in 2020–21 CAF Confederation Cup against ES Sétif.

Style of play 
Frimpong plays as central midfielder. Along with being a good passer with great vision he also composes the ability to contribute to offensive play along with being a solid tackler. When he was signed by Asante Kotoko, he was seen as a player to help strength the centre of the field for club and form a good midfield partnership with Justice Blay.

References

External links 
 
 
 

Living people
1996 births
Association football midfielders
Ghanaian footballers
Dalkurd FF players
KSF Prespa Birlik players
Mjällby AIF players
Salalah SC players
Asante Kotoko S.C. players